Lake Villa is the name of some places in the United States:

 Lake Villa, Illinois, a village
 Lake Villa Township, Lake County, Illinois